The 2009 Yambol bus crash occurred on 28 May 2009 near the city of Yambol in southeastern Bulgaria. Eighteen people died, and around twenty were injured. The driver was among the wounded, and died in prison during his ten-year sentence.

Crash
The victims had been walking up the Bakadzhik peak to attend a traditional Ascension Day (Spasovden) feast and fair held on the summit. Around 9:15 AM local time the bus, a Chavdar 11M4 operated by the Yambol transport company MCI Slavi Slavov, crashed into a group of pedestrians while descending from a tour to the Alexander Nevsky Memorial Church located at the summit

Although the bus had been declared roadworthy on 12 May, some speculate that the cause for the accident may have been brake failure. Other factors that contributed to the tragedy were the narrow road, the high speed and the damp asphalt. The driver, 60-year-old Gospodin Gospodinov, was legally sober. He was seriously injured and treated at Pirogov Hospital in Sofia.

Most of the victims were over 60 years old, and one a 16-year-old boy. Thirteen dead were women and five were men; all were from Yambol or the nearby villages. Twenty people were injured, four initially in critical condition due to head trauma.

Reaction
29 May was declared a national day of mourning in Bulgaria. Political parties paused their European Parliament election campaigns for the next few days. The National Assembly of Bulgaria observed a minute of silence as the news broke out. President Georgi Parvanov and Prime Minister Sergei Stanishev changed their schedules and visited the scene of the accident, their offices said.

Investigation
Post-crash inspection revealed that the bus had numerous technical deficiencies. Its brakes provided only 23% brake force; nails, wire, and a coin were found to have been used to carry out repairs on the bus.

In 2012, bus driver Gospodin Gospodinov and bus owner Slavi Slavov were each sentenced to ten years in prison. Gospodinov died there a few months later, while Slavov absconded until his January 2018 capture. The workshop that declared the bus roadworthy did not face any legal consequences.

See also
2021 Bulgaria bus crash

References

External links
 Video PRO TV (Romanian)
 Location of the accident on Google Maps

2009 in Bulgaria
2009 road incidents
Bus incidents in Bulgaria
May 2009 events in Europe
2009
2009 disasters in Bulgaria